Greenhill is a suburb to the northeast of Weymouth in Dorset, England, with a sand and shingle beach.

The A353 road, locally known as Greenhill, runs parallel and close to the beach. To the northeast it becomes Preston Road, leading to the village of Preston. Also to the northeast along the coast are Furzy Cliff, Jordan Hill, and Bowleaze Cove. To the southwest is the sandy Weymouth Beach and seaward is Weymouth Bay.

The suburb contains Greenhill Gardens.

See also
List of Dorset beaches

References

External links

Geography of Weymouth, Dorset
Beaches of Dorset
Jurassic Coast